SSPF may refer to:
 Space Station Processing Facility, a factory at the Kennedy Space Center in Florida, U.S.
 SS and police leader, a senior Nazi official
 State Social Protection Fund (Azerbaijan)
 Sam Schmidt Paralysis Foundation, an American charitable organization